Israsel Zelitch is an American plant pathologist and ecologist, formerly at Connecticut Agricultural Experiment Station and an Elected Fellow of the American Association for the Advancement of Science and American Academy of Arts and Sciences.

Education
B.S. Agricultural and Biological Chemistry, Pennsylvania State University, 1947
Ph.D, Biochemistry, University of Wisconsin, 1951
National Research Council Postdoctoral Fellow, NYU College of Medicine, 1951-1952

References

Year of birth missing (living people)
Living people
Fellows of the American Association for the Advancement of Science
American pathologists
American ecologists
Pennsylvania State University alumni
University of Wisconsin–Madison alumni
New York University Grossman School of Medicine alumni